Firoza Begum (28 July 1930 – 9 September 2014) was a Bangladeshi Nazrul Geeti singer. She was awarded the Independence Day Award in 1979 by the Government of Bangladesh.

Early life and career

Firoza Begum was born in Gopalganj District on 28 July 1930 to the zamindar family of Ratail Ghonaparha. Her parents were Mohammad Ismail and Begum Kowkabunnesa. She became drawn to music in her childhood. She started her career in 1940s.

Firoza Begum first sang in All India Radio while studying in sixth grade. She met the national poet Kazi Nazrul Islam at the age of 10. She became a student of him. In 1942, she recorded her first Islamic song by the gramophone record company HMV in 78 rpm disk format. Since then, 12 LP, 4 EP, 6 CD and more than 20 audio cassette records have been released. She lived in Kolkata from 1954 until she moved to Dhaka in 1967.

Personal life
In 1956, Firoza Begum was married to Kamal Dasgupta (who converted to Islam before the marriage and took the name Kamal Uddin Ahmed), a singer, composer, and lyricist. Kamal died on 20 July 1974. Two of their three sons, Hamin Ahmed and Shafin Ahmed are musicians. They are currently members of the rock band Miles.

Death
Firoza Begum died on 9 September 2014 in Apollo Hospital, Dhaka due to heart and kidney problems.

Awards and honours

Awards
 Independence Day Award (1979)
 Netaji Subhash Chandra Award
 Satyajit Ray Award
 Nasiruddin Gold Medal
 Bangladesh Shilpakala Academy Gold Medal
 Best Nazrul Sangeet Singer Award
 Nazrul Academy Award
 Churulia Gold Medal
 Gold Disk from CBS, Japan
 Meril-Prothom Alo Lifetime honorary award (2011)
 Sheltech Award (2000)

Honours
 D Lit from University of Burdwan
 Bongo Shomman from Mamata Banerjee (2012)

Legacy 
The 'Feroza Begum Memorial Gold Medal' was introduced from 2016 by Dhaka University. The recipient is selected by a jury board each year from nationally recognised music artists.

On 28 July 2018, Google celebrated Firoza Begum's 88th Birthday with a Google Doodle.

References

1930 births
2014 deaths
Recipients of the Independence Day Award
People from Faridpur District
20th-century Bangladeshi women singers
20th-century Bangladeshi singers
21st-century Bangladeshi women singers
21st-century Bangladeshi singers
Burials at Banani Graveyard
Bangladeshi Nazrul Geeti singers
Honorary Fellows of Bangla Academy
Meril-Prothom Alo Lifetime Achievement Award winners